

This is a list of the National Register of Historic Places listings in Little River County, Arkansas.

This is intended to be a complete list of the properties and districts on the National Register of Historic Places in Little River County, Arkansas, United States. The locations of National Register properties and districts for which the latitude and longitude coordinates are included below, may be seen in a map.

There are 16 properties and districts listed on the National Register in the county, and one former listing.

Current listings

|}

Former listing

|}

See also

List of National Historic Landmarks in Arkansas
National Register of Historic Places listings in Arkansas

References

 
Tourist attractions in Little River County, Arkansas
Little River County